Cut is a 2011 Japanese drama film directed by Amir Naderi, starring Hidetoshi Nishijima and Takako Tokiwa.

Cast
 Hidetoshi Nishijima as Shuji
 Takako Tokiwa as Yoko
 Takashi Sasano as Hiroshi
 Shun Sugata as Masaki
 Denden as Takagaki
 Takuji Suzuki as Nakamichi

Production
Cut was initially inspired by the director Amir Naderi's relationship with the late John Cassavetes. After he met the actor Hidetoshi Nishijima at the Tokyo Filmex festival in 2002, he decided to adapt the story to Japan.

Reception
Neil Young of The Hollywood Reporter described Cut as "Amir Naderi's violent homage to Japanese cinema". Dan Fainaru of Screen International felt that the film is "certainly one of the most significant to come out this year in Venice, both in shape and content." Chris Cabin of Slant Magazine gave the film 2 out of 4 stars. He commented that Shuji might be "the most convincingly pretentious and frustrated cinephile to ever be portrayed on film" and Hidetoshi Nishijima is "admirable in conveying Shuji's caustic misanthropy without making him entirely unlikable." Meanwhile, Ben Umstead of Twitch Film criticized the film, noting that the film's climax is "so cinema-indulgent that it may perhaps only be tolerated by a cinephile that can knowingly take it in with a sense of humor and a great sense of empathy... and a lot in between."

Mark Shilling of The Japan Times gave the film 3.5 out of 5 stars. He said: "As stills from some of Naderi's 100 favorites flash on the screen amid the blows and blood, Cut becomes not only a paean to beloved films, but also a rallying cry against the forces of greed and cynicism. The ultra violence, however, threatens to drown out the message. [...] Despite the many shout-outs to Japanese directors in Cut, from Akira Kurosawa to Takeshi Kitano, Naderi is not simply the latest foreigner trying to make a fake 'Japanese movie.' Instead he has made a Naderi movie, using Japanese cinema as an inspiration, while referencing the local culture's traditional love of the self-sacrificial hero."

References

External links
  
 

Films directed by Amir Naderi
Japanese drama films
2011 films
2011 drama films
2010s Japanese films
2010s Japanese-language films